Four Men In Prison is a 1950 documentary film about English prison conditions directed by Max Anderson. 
Filmed at Wakefield Prison, it was commissioned for the purpose of educating people involved in criminal justice.

The film was criticised for being inaccurate and sensational, and was quickly withdrawn.

Production
The film was made for educational purposes by the Central Office of Information to be shown privately to magistrates and others who were involved in administering criminal justice.
The Home Office initiated production of the film, which cost £16,000.
It was one of three produced under Donald Taylor at the Crown Film Unit and completed in 1950.
John Grierson was the producer and the film was directed by Max Anderson.

Synopsis

The film deals with penology.
It is semi-documentary.
It depicts the impact that living in prison has on four very different offenders.
One is serving a short sentence for a first-time offence, one is a youthful thief who is mentally sub-normal, one is being given training to prevent him from turning into a habitual criminal and the fourth is a hardened criminal who knows the ropes of prison existence.

Reception

The film was aired for the first time at a magistrate's conference.
The reaction was immediate and public, with the film condemned for inaccuracy and sensationalism.
The magistrates said the first offender and the mentally defective thief would not in fact have been sentenced in jail.
The film "disappeared under a ban of official disapproval."

Cast

William Mervyn		
Arthur Mullard, Prison officer

References

Sources

External links

1950 films
1950 documentary films
Black-and-white documentary films
Documentary films about the penal system
British documentary films
English films
British docufiction films
Penal system in England
Films directed by Max Anderson
Films set in England
1950 in England
Yorkshire in fiction
Wakefield
British black-and-white films
1950s English-language films
1950s British films